"It's Corn" is a song by The Gregory Brothers that remixes portions of an August 2022 interview of Tariq on Recess Therapy. The song was released in August 28, 2022 on YouTube and went viral on social media platforms. After the interview, seven-year-old Tariq was dubbed the CEO of Corn, and nicknamed the "Corn Kid."

On September 4, 2022, Kevin Bacon covered the song and posted it on Instagram. His cover was called “a soulful acoustic rendition” on Billboard. Later that month, Tariq attended the premiere of the 2022 film  Pinocchio, appeared on the The Drew Barrymore Show, and an advertisement for Chipotle Mexican Grill. Kristi Noem, the governor of South Dakota, declared September 3 as "Official Corn-bassador Tariq Day".

References 

2022 songs
Interviews
2022 YouTube videos
Novelty songs
Viral videos